Alain Sans (born 20 March 1945) is a French middle-distance runner. He competed in the men's 800 metres at the 1972 Summer Olympics.

References

1945 births
Living people
Athletes (track and field) at the 1972 Summer Olympics
French male middle-distance runners
Olympic athletes of France
Place of birth missing (living people)